Blencarn is a small village located in the Eden District of Cumbria, England. The village is situated at the foot of the Pennines.

In Blencarn there is fly fishing at the  Blencarn lake.

Geography 
Blencarn is located in the Eden valley near the Pennines. Blencarn is situated 2.86 km west of Kirkland fell and Cross Fell. A number of streams run nearby: Blencarn Beck, Crowdundle Beck, Skirwith Beck, Kirkland Beck, Sunndgill Beck and Aigill Sike as well as Blencarn lake. 
The village of Kirkland is located 1.31 km northeast. The village of Milburn is located 2.26 km south and the village of Skirwith 2.05 km north.

History 
There has been activity near Blencarn as early as the Roman era. An old Roman road known as Maiden Way once ran nearby and 1.27 km northeast near the farm of Ranbeck lies various ancient "cultivation terraces" known as "The Hanging Walls of Mark Antony".

Blencarn is marked as "Blenkerne" on Christopher Saxton’s 1579 map of Westmorland and Cumberland, as "Blenkern" on a 1760 map of the area and as its current name on Carry's 1794 map of England, Scotland and Wales.

Famous and notable people 
It is the home of the notable painter and printmaker Alan Stones.

References

External links
 Cumbria County History Trust: Kirkland and Blencarn (nb: provisional research only – see Talk page)

Blencarn Village Website: http://blencarn.emyspot.com/

Villages in Cumbria
Eden District